Jacory Patterson (born February 2, 2000) is an American track and field athlete specializing in the sprints. As a freshman at Virginia Tech in 2019, he set the world under-20 record in the indoor 300 m with a time of 32.49 s. After winning six Atlantic Coast Conference championships at Virginia Tech from 2019 to 2021, Patterson transferred to the University of Florida ahead of his senior year. In 2022, he set the collegiate record in the indoor 300 m with a time of 31.99 s to make him the eighth-fastest man in the history of the event.

Early years
A native  of Columbia, South Carolina, Patterson was born to Jamey Patterson and Charlene Bolton. He began track and field in the sixth grade because he always found himself to be the fastest kid on the playground. He attended Dreher High School, where he competed in track and field and basketball, though he dropped the latter after the tenth grade when he realized he had more potential on the track. Patterson won the long jump competition at the 2016 USATF Junior Olympics, as well as the South Carolina 4A state title in the 400 m as a senior in 2018. He broke the state record in the 200 m, as well as school records in the 100 m, 400 m, long jump and triple jump. Patterson narrowed down his college choices to Virginia Tech, LSU, Iowa, South Carolina and Clemson, ultimately committing to run track for the Virginia Tech Hokies in November 2017.

College career

Virginia Tech
Patterson competed for the Virginia Tech Hokies in the Atlantic Coast Conference (ACC) from 2019 to 2021, winning six ACC championships.

2019 indoor season
Patterson thought that the long jump could be his strongest event, but Virginia Tech sprints, hurdles, and relays coach Tim Vaught convinced him to focus on the sprints ahead of his freshman year. In his collegiate debut at the Virginia Tech Invitational on January 11, Patterson broke the world under-20 record in the indoor 300 m with a time of 32.49 seconds. It was the second fastest time in indoor collegiate history. "I kind of looked at him after that run," said Vaught. "He knew that his jumping career was over." Patterson was named the Division I men's national athlete of the week by the U.S. Track and Field Cross Country Coaches Association (USTFCCCA) for his performance. Two weeks later, he set a school record in the indoor 200 m after clocking 20.84 s at the Bob Pollock Invitational, shaving two-tenths of a second off the previous mark. Patterson broke another school record at the Virginia Tech Elite Meet on February 1, this time taking more than eight-tenths of a second off the indoor 400 m mark with a time of 46.14 s.

Patterson won the 400 m title at the ACC Indoor Championships with a time of 46.04 s, improving on his own school record and becoming the first Virginia Tech athlete to win an indoor conference title in the 400 m distance. He competed at the NCAA Division I Indoor Championships, but was not able to finish his race due to making contact with another runner.

2019 outdoor season
In his first outdoor meet, Patterson posted a school record time in the 400 m at the Florida Relays. His official time of 45.76 s took almost a full second off the previous mark of 46.73 s set by Hillard Sumner in 1996. In April, Patterson won the 200 m race at the Tennessee Relays before winning the 400 m race at the War Eagle Invitational.

At the ACC Outdoor Championships, Patterson won the 400 m title and placed second in the 200 m. He also finished second as a member of the 4 × 100 m relay team, recording a school record time of 39.46 s alongside teammates Michael Davenport, Joseph Tay and Cole Beck. Lastly, Patterson anchored the 4 × 400 m relay team that finished fourth. "He went out and did a great job," said coach Vaught of his performance. "I knew the key [to competing in four events] was going to be the recovery in between and telling him what to do and that type of stuff. I knew he was tough enough and strong enough to be able to handle those events." At the NCAA preliminaries, Patterson improved his school record in the 400 m by clocking a time of 45.46 s. He also reset the school record in the 4 × 100 m relay by timing 39.24 s with Davenport, Tay and Beck.

2020 indoor season
Patterson opened the season by setting the indoor 300 m collegiate record at the Virginia Tech Invitational with a time of a 32.28 seconds, breaking Torrin Lawrence's time of 32.32 seconds set in 2010. At the same meet, he anchored the 4 × 400 m relay team that recorded a school record time of 3:09.28. In February, Patterson broke his own school record in the indoor 400 m by running 45.75 s at the Texas Tech Shootout. Patterson improved on this mark once again at the ACC Indoor Championships, clocking 45.66 s to capture the 400 m title and qualify for the NCAA Division I Indoor Championships. He also claimed silver with the 4 × 400 m relay team. However, the national championships were cancelled due to the COVID-19 pandemic.

2021 indoor season
After the cancellation of the 2020 outdoor season, Patterson took first place in the 300 m at the Virginia Tech Invitational to start the indoor season. His winning time of 32.61 ended up as the top indoor performance by an American in 2021. Patterson set a new school (and conference) record in the 400 m in February, running 45.24 for a second-place finish at the Tiger Paw Invitational. At the same event, he helped set a new school record in the 4 × 400 m relay, recording a time of 3:07.64 alongside teammates Patrick Forrest, Miles Green and Tyreke Sapp.

Patterson won the 200 m and 400 m titles at the ACC Indoor Championships, setting a school record of 20.62 s in the former and a meet record of 45.38 s in the latter. He became just the fourth male sprinter in ACC history to win the 200/400 m double at the conference championships, earning the men's award for Most Outstanding Track performer. Patterson won a bronze medal in the 400 m event at the NCAA Division I Indoor Championships, breaking his own ACC record with a time of 45.14 s. He was named the ACC Men's Indoor Track Performer of the Year at the conclusion of the season.

2021 outdoor season
At the Florida Relays on April 3, Patterson became the first Virginia Tech athlete to break the 45-second barrier in the 400 m, clocking 44.81 s for a second-place finish. At the ACC Outdoor Championships, he won gold in the 400 m as well as the 4 × 400 m relay. The team of Patterson, Patrick Forrest, Cameron Rose and Tyreke Sapp became the first 4 × 400 m squad in school history to win an outdoor conference title. Patterson qualified to run in both events at the NCAA Division I Outdoor Championships, but instead announced his decision to transfer to the University of Florida just a few days before he was scheduled to compete.

Patterson competed at the U.S. Olympic Trials in June, reaching the 400 m semifinals before being eliminated.

Florida
Patterson competed for the Florida Gators in the Southeastern Conference (SEC) as a senior in 2022.

2022 indoor season
Patterson won the Clemson Invitational in 31.99 s in his Florida debut, improving on his own 300 m collegiate record. He also set a personal best in the 60 m with a time of 6.68 s. At the Bob Pollock Invitational, Patterson won the 400 m race and ran the leadoff leg on the gold medal-winning 4 × 400 m relay team that set a new NCAA lead of 3:03.21. Two weeks later, he won the 200 m event and anchored the 4 × 400 m relay team to a new world-leading performance of 3:02.09 at the Tyson Invitational. At the SEC Indoor Championships, Patterson finished fourth in the 400 m before anchoring the 4 × 400 m relay team to a silver medal performance. At the NCAA Division I Indoor Championships, he finished fifth in the 400 m and seventh in the 4 × 400 m relay. Patterson was named an indoor first-team All-American in both events by the USTFCCCA.

2022 outdoor season
At the season opening Texas Relays, Patterson teamed with Dedrick Vanover, Ryan Willie and Jacob Miley to record the second-fastest 4 × 200 m relay time in school history at 1:21.02. On April 1, he ran a personal best time of 20.20 s to win his 200 m heat at the Florida Relays, tying for the NCAA lead and giving him the seventh-best time in school history. Two weeks later, Patterson set a new 100 m personal best in 10.11 s at the Tom Jones Memorial Invitational. He also anchored the 4 × 400 m relay team that clocked a new collegiate record of 2:58.53 to close out the meet. The team of Patterson, Willie, Miley and Champion Allison became the first collegiate team in history to run under 2:59.00.

Achievements

Personal bests
All information taken from World Athletics profile.

National championships

Notes

References

External links
 
 Virginia Tech Hokies bio
 Florida Gators bio

Living people
2000 births
American male sprinters
African-American male track and field athletes
Virginia Tech Hokies men's track and field athletes
Florida Gators men's track and field athletes
Track and field athletes from South Carolina
Sportspeople from Columbia, South Carolina
21st-century African-American sportspeople